Paul Louis Marcel Genevay (21 January 1939 – 11 March 2022) was a French sprinter. He competed in the 200 m and 4 × 100 m events at the 1960 and 1964 Olympics and won a bronze medal in the relay in 1964. He failed to reach the final in three other competitions. Genevay won two gold and one silver medals in the sprint at the 1959 Mediterranean Games. He died on 11 March 2022, at the age of 83.

References

1939 births
2022 deaths
French male sprinters
Sportspeople from Isère
Olympic bronze medalists for France
Athletes (track and field) at the 1960 Summer Olympics
Athletes (track and field) at the 1964 Summer Olympics
Olympic athletes of France
Medalists at the 1964 Summer Olympics
Olympic bronze medalists in athletics (track and field)
Mediterranean Games gold medalists for France
Mediterranean Games silver medalists for France
Athletes (track and field) at the 1959 Mediterranean Games
Athletes (track and field) at the 1963 Mediterranean Games
Mediterranean Games medalists in athletics
20th-century French people